Quantifier elimination is a concept of simplification used in mathematical logic, model theory, and theoretical computer science. Informally, a quantified statement " such that " can be viewed as a question "When is there an  such that ?", and the statement without quantifiers can be viewed as the answer to that question.

One way of classifying formulas is by the amount of quantification. Formulas with less depth of quantifier alternation are thought of as being simpler, with the quantifier-free formulas as the simplest.
A theory has quantifier elimination if for every formula , there exists another formula  without quantifiers that is equivalent to it (modulo this theory).

Examples 
An example from high school mathematics says that a single-variable quadratic polynomial has a real root if and only if its discriminant is non-negative:
 
Here the sentence on the left-hand side involves a quantifier , while the equivalent sentence on the right does not.

Examples of theories that have been shown decidable using quantifier elimination are Presburger arithmetic, algebraically closed fields, real closed fields,
 atomless Boolean algebras, term algebras, dense linear orders, abelian groups, random graphs, as well as many of their combinations such as Boolean algebra with Presburger arithmetic, and term algebras with queues.

Quantifier eliminator for the theory of the real numbers as an ordered additive group is Fourier–Motzkin elimination; for the theory of the field of real numbers it is the Tarski–Seidenberg theorem.

Quantifier elimination can also be used to show that "combining" decidable theories leads to new decidable theories (see Feferman-Vaught theorem).

Algorithms and decidability 

If a theory has quantifier elimination, then a specific question can be addressed: Is there a method of determining  for each ? If there is such a method we call it a quantifier elimination algorithm. If there is such an algorithm, then decidability for the theory reduces to deciding the truth of the quantifier-free sentences. Quantifier-free sentences have no variables, so their validity in a given theory can often be computed, which enables the use of quantifier elimination algorithms to decide validity of sentences.

Related concepts 

Various model-theoretic ideas are related to quantifier elimination, and there are various equivalent conditions.

Every first-order theory with quantifier elimination is model complete. Conversely, a model-complete theory, whose theory of universal consequences has the amalgamation property, has quantifier elimination.

The theory of linear orders does not have quantifier elimination. However the theory of its universal consequences has the amalgamation property.

Basic ideas 

To show constructively that a theory has quantifier elimination, it suffices to show that we can eliminate an existential quantifier applied to a conjunction of literals, that is, show that each formula of the form:

where each  is a literal, is equivalent to a quantifier-free formula. Indeed, suppose we know how to eliminate quantifiers from conjunctions of literals, then if  is a quantifier-free formula, we can write it in disjunctive normal form

and use the fact that

is equivalent to

Finally, to eliminate a universal quantifier

where  is quantifier-free, we transform 
 into disjunctive normal form, and use the fact that 
is equivalent to

Relationship with decidability
In early model theory, quantifier elimination was used to demonstrate that various theories possess properties like decidability and completeness. A common technique was to show first that a theory admits elimination of quantifiers and thereafter prove decidability or completeness by considering only the quantifier-free formulas. This technique can be used to show that Presburger arithmetic is decidable.

Theories could be decidable yet not admit quantifier elimination. Strictly speaking, the theory of the additive natural numbers did not admit quantifier elimination, but it was an expansion of the additive natural numbers that was shown to be decidable. Whenever a theory  is decidable, and the language of its valid formulas is countable, it is possible to extend the theory with countably many relations to have quantifier elimination (for example, one can introduce, for each formula of the theory, a relation symbol that relates the free variables of the formula).

Example: Nullstellensatz for algebraically closed fields and for differentially closed fields.

See also 
 Cylindrical algebraic decomposition
 Elimination theory
 Conjunction elimination

Notes

References 

, see  for an English translation

Model theory